Kauaiina ioxantha is a moth of the family Geometridae. It was first described by Edward Meyrick in 1899. It is endemic to the Hawaiian island of Kauai.

External links

Larentiinae
Endemic moths of Hawaii
Biota of Kauai
Moths described in 1899